François Pelletier was a French illusionist, famed in his time for his use of magnets as an entertainment basis for his act.  His reputation was such that he was invited to perform at the court of Maria Theresa of Austria at Schönbrunn Palace in 1769.  His act inspired the construction of the purported chess-playing automaton The Turk, following observation of the performance by the Hungarian Wolfgang von Kempelen.

References

 Correspondance littéraire, philosophique et critique, January 1770, pp. 444-5.
 "Optique" in Nouvelles de la république des lettres et des arts, 31 July 1782, pp. 231-2.
 François Pelletier, Hommage aux amateurs des arts, ou Mémoire contenant un détail abrégé d'inventions utiles et agréables dans la mécanique, l'optique, Saint-Germain-en-Laye chez l'auteur, 1782.
 Mémoires secrets, 12 juin 1783.
 "Course" in Journal de Paris, 23 December 1785, p. 1477.
 Luc-Vincent Thiéry, Guide des amateurs et des étrangers voyageurs à Paris, 1787, p. 495. (Gallica BNF | Google Books)
 Tom Standage, The Turk: The Life and Times of the Famous Eighteenth-Century Chess-Playing Machine. Walker and Company, New York City, 2002. 
 Gerald M. Levitt, The Turk, Chess Automaton. McFarland and Company Inc. Publishers, Jefferson, North Carolina, 2000.

French magicians
Year of birth missing
Year of death missing
18th-century French people